= Jhangaha =

Village in Uttar Pradesh, India

Jhangaha is a village in Gorakhpur, Uttar Pradesh, India.
